Shore power or shore supply is the provision of shoreside electrical power to a ship at berth while its main and auxiliary engines are shut down. While the term denotes shore as opposed to off-shore, it is sometimes applied to aircraft or land-based vehicles (such as campers, heavy trucks with sleeping compartments and tour buses), which may plug into grid power when parked for idle reduction. 

The source for land-based power may be grid power from an electric utility company, but also possibly an external remote generator. These generators may be powered by diesel or renewable energy sources such as wind or solar.

Shore power saves consumption of fuel that would otherwise be used to power vessels while in port, and eliminates the air pollution associated with consumption of that fuel. A port city may have anti-idling laws that require ships to use shore power. Use of shore power may facilitate maintenance of the ship's engines and generators, and reduces noise.

Oceangoing ships
"Cold ironing" is specifically a shipping industry term that came into use when all ships had coal-fired engines. When a ship tied up at port, there was no need to continue to feed the fire and the iron engines would cool down, eventually going completely cold – hence the term "cold ironing". Commercial ships can use shore-supplied power for services such as cargo handling, pumping, ventilation and lighting while in port, they need not run their own diesel engines, reducing air pollution emissions. Examples are ferries and cruise ships for hotel electric power, and a salmon feeder ship uses shore power while at the salmon farm.

Small craft
On small private boats, electrical power supply on board is usually provided by 12 or 24 volt DC batteries whilst at sea unless the vessel has a generator. When the vessel is berthed in a marina or harbourside, mains electricity is often offered via a shore power connection. This allows the vessel to use a battery charger to recharge batteries and also to run mains-powered AC devices such as TV, washing machine, cooking appliances and air conditioning. The power is usually provided from a power pedestal on the dock which is often metered or has a card payment system if electricity is not provided free of charge. The vessel connects to the supply using a suitable shore power cable.

Trucks 
Shore power, as it relates to the trucking industry, is commonly referred to as "Truck Stop Electrification" (TSE). The US Environmental Protection Agency estimates that trucks plugging in versus idling on diesel fuel could save as much as $3240 annually.  there were 138 truck stops in the USA that offer on-board systems (also called Shore power) or off-board systems (also called single system electrification) for an hourly fee.
Auxiliary power units offer another alternative to both idling and shore power for trucks.

Aircraft
Similar to shore power for ships, a ground power unit (GPU) may be used to supply electric power for an aircraft on the ground, to sustain interior lighting, ventilation and other requirements before starting of the main engines or the aircraft auxiliary power unit (APU). It is also used by aircraft with APUs if the airport authority does not permit the usage of APUs at its docks or if the carrier wishes to save on the use of jet fuel (which APUs use). This may be a self-contained engine-generator set, or it may convert commercial power to the voltage and frequency needed for the aircraft (for example 115 V 400 Hz).

Trains and buses 
Shorepower may be a grid connection for passenger trains laying over between runs. Similarly buses may be connected when not in use.

See also
 IEC 60309 2P+E plugs are used in Europe for small boats providing 16,32 or 63 amps at 220-250 volts
 NEMA L5-30 plugs are most often used in N. America for small boats
 IEC/ISO/IEEE 80005 - international standard for larger vessels
Shore Power Market Worth $2.7 Billion by 2024

References 

Air pollution control systems
Ports and harbours
Nautical terminology
Power electronics
Port infrastructure
Maritime transport